A Coffee in Berlin, also titled Oh Boy, is a 2012 German tragicomedy film directed by Jan-Ole Gerster. It is in black-and-white. It is the director's debut film, and thesis project for the German Film and Television Academy in Berlin.

The film premiered at the 2012 Karlovy Vary International Film Festival. In 2014, the film was released in the US under the title A Coffee in Berlin.

Plot
Niko tries to sneak out of his girlfriend's apartment before she wakes, but has to tell her that he will not be back that evening because he has some vague things to do. She offers coffee, but he says he is late already. He moves boxes into a new apartment, looking through old photos, and checks his mail. He opens an official letter and realizes he is late for an appointment.

The appointment is with a state psychologist, as Niko was caught driving under the influence. In this interview Niko says he has dropped out of law school. The psychologist messes around with Niko, asks him if he is gay, insecure about his short stature, about the relationship to his parents altogether leading questions, ultimately deciding not to give him back his license, as he deems Niko unstable.

When Niko goes to get coffee in a fashionable coffeeshop, he doesn't have enough money. After giving what little money he has to a sleeping beggar, the ATM eats his card, so he tries to take the money back but a passerby spots him appearing to steal from the homeless. Niko leaves a message for his father to help him with his bank card situation. Niko's lonely neighbour brings him a house warming gift and invites himself into the apartment. The man talks about his personal problems and eventually weeps, while Niko awkwardly consoles this stranger.

Niko and his friend Matze, a failed actor, head to a pub for lunch where Niko orders a coffee, but the machine is broken. A former classmate named Julika recognizes Niko, and joins the table. Niko does not recognize her, an attractive, slender woman, as she was overweight in school. She says she left that school for a boarding school after a suicide attempt because she was teased for being fat. She insists she had a crush on Niko at age 13. She has become an avant-garde dancer and invites both Niko and Matze to a play that she is performing in later that night.

The boys go to a movie set, where Matze's friend is the main actor playing a Nazi officer in WW2 in love with a Jewish woman he shelters in his basement. They hang out in his trailer, and Matze asks whether he might be able to play a small role in the film. While on the set, Niko's father returns Niko's call; Niko says he's in the library studying.  His father invites him to play golf.

At the golf course Niko's father introduces him to his new assistant Schneider as "my favorite son". Niko says "his only son." His father jokes, "Don't be too sure about that." His father points out that his new assistant is younger than Niko, but has already obtained his JD. Niko's father criticizes his golf technique. At the club house Niko orders coffee, but his father cancels it saying it was too late in the morning for that and orders 3 shots of Schnapps. When the shots arrive, his father tells the assistant he can't drink his shot because he is driving, and orders him to get the car. Then he confronts Niko about dropping out of law school and lying to him for two years. He asks about what he did all that time and Niko answers: "I have thought about myself and about you." Niko's father tells Niko that he has always been a disappointment, and that he closed his bank account. He advises him to get new shoes and a job "like everyone else". He gives Niko a few hundred euro and leaves. Niko drinks both shots and walks through a forest looking upward through the trees.

At the subway station, the ticket machine is broken and Niko rides without a ticket. He has an absurd argument with two plainclothes subway ticket inspectors, until he manages to run away and escapes on a different train. He buys liquor in an Arab cornerstore.

Later that evening Matze picks him up, but first wants to buy drugs from his friend Marcel. An elderly woman opens the door, but doesn't let them in until Marcel, the drug dealer comes to the door. She offers to make sandwiches, but Marcel declines. He leads them to his room where several people sit around a hookah. Niko leaves the room and turns his attention to the elderly grandmother who owns the apartment. She offers to make him sandwiches and to show him the electric massaging recliner her grandson bought her.

Matze and Niko arrive late at the Tacheles for the play that Julika is in. They squeeze into their seats and sit through a confusing avant garde dance theater play in which Julika mimes eating her own body followed by vomiting. Matze laughs. At the cast party Julika introduces them to the writer/director who is furious at Matze for laughing through the play. Matze said he thought it was a comedy. Niko leaves the argument to get a breath of fresh air in the street and to smoke, where he is joined by Julika. Three drunk men harass Julika, who talks back, until Niko is punched in the nose. Julika nurses him back in the dressing room. A closeness develops between the two after both state how the other has changed. Julika says how he changed from being confident and self-assured. They start kissing and begin to engage in sex, when all of a sudden Julika insists he say, "I want to fuck the fat little Julika." Niko becomes uncomfortable, the embracing stops, and Julika is furious that he stopped, suggesting he still thinks she is too fat. When he tries to explain that he feels awkward about the situation, she yells "Everybody wants to fuck me" and kicks him out.

Niko goes to a bar and orders coffee, but the coffee machine has already been cleaned for the evening. He orders a vodka and beer. An elderly drunk man takes a seat beside him, talking constantly, even though Niko asks him to leave him alone. But the man orders a drink for Niko, wishes him "salute" and Niko tolerates him. The man insists he can't understand what people are saying. Niko says it is German. The man laughs saying he went away for 60 years. Niko asks where. The man says, "Away." He talks about how everything had changed, the very bar they sit in, and the neighborhood. As a small child he was trained to salute Hitler and he witnessed his father smashing the windows of the store that is now a bar. He said he cried because the glass chips meant he could no longer ride his bike there. The man leaves the bar, only to collapse on the sidewalk. Niko accompanies him in the ambulance to the hospital, where the man eventually dies the next morning. The nurse tells him he had no relatives, and his first name was Friederich.

Niko leaves the hospital as a new day dawns. With shaky hands he finally drinks a cup of coffee in a diner.

Cast 
 Tom Schilling as Niko Fischer
 Marc Hosemann as Matze
 Friederike Kempter as Julika Hoffmann
 Justus von Dohnányi as Karl Speckenbach
 Katharina Schüttler as Elli
 Arnd Klawitter as Phillip Rauch
 Martin Brambach as Jörg
 Steffen Jürgens as Ralf
 Michael Gwisdek as Friedrich
 Ulrich Noethen as Walter Fischer
 Frederick Lau as Ronny

Awards

References

 Blankenship, Robert and Jill E. Twark. "'Berliner Sonderschule': History, Space, and Humour in Jan Ole Gerster's Oh Boy (A Coffee in Berlin). Seminar: A Journal of Germanic Studies. 53.4 (November 2017): 362-381.

External links
 

German comedy-drama films
European Film Awards winners (films)
Films set in Berlin
2010s German films